Honey, I Blew Up the Kid is a 1992 American science fiction comedy family film sequel to Honey, I Shrunk the Kids,  and the second installment of the Honey, I Shrunk the Kids film series. Directed by Randal Kleiser and released by Walt Disney Pictures, it stars Rick Moranis, Marcia Strassman, Amy O'Neill, and Robert Oliveri reprising their roles as the Szalinski family, as well as newcomer Keri Russell in her film debut. In the film, Adam Szalinski, the youngest addition to the family, is accidentally exposed to Wayne's new industrial-sized growth machine, which causes him to gradually grow to enormous size. Wayne's coworker, Dr. Charles Hendrickson, wants the giant Adam stopped at all costs, and would like to take over Wayne's invention, which is now owned by the large coorporation belonging to the kindly Clifford Sterling.

The franchise continued with a direct-to-home video sequel, a television series, and theme-park attractions.

Plot

Three years after the events of the first film, inventor Wayne Szalinski and his family have moved to Nevada and have welcomed a new son, mischievous two-year-old Adam. One day, Wayne's wife, Diane, leaves with their daughter, Amy, to help her settle in her dorm at college, leaving Wayne to look after Adam and their now teenage son, Nick. Nick has developed a crush on Mandy Park, whom Wayne later arranges to babysit Adam. The next day, Wayne takes Nick and Adam to Sterling Labs, where he has constructed an advanced derivative of his shrink ray which enlarges objects. He tests it out on Adam's favorite toy, Big Bunny. However, when his and Nick's backs are turned, Adam attempts to retrieve it and is zapped by the machine, which appears to short circuit and not enlarge the targeted object.

Back home, Adam and Big Bunny are exposed to electrical waves from the microwave oven and grow in size, now 7 feet tall. Wayne and Nick try to take him back to the lab to reverse the process, but are caught and kicked out by Wayne's coworker, Dr. Charles Hendrickson, who wants to take over Wayne's invention for himself. Diane returns home early and discovers what happened, and she, Wayne, and Nick have a hard time trying to take care of the large Adam. Later, Wayne and Diane drive to a warehouse and retrieve Wayne's first shrink ray prototype to turn Adam back to normal. When Mandy arrives to babysit Adam, she panics and faints, forcing Nick to bind her. As he explains the situation to her, Adam is exposed to the television's electrical waves and grows to 14 feet before escaping through a wall.

Nick and Mandy search for him, but are taken into custody, with Adam placed into a truck. Wayne and Diane return home, finding Dr. Hendrickson and a U.S. Marshal waiting for them. He has summoned Clifford Sterling, the company chairman, with the plan to fire Wayne, have him and Diane arrested, and experiment on Adam. Sterling arrives and instead praises Wayne when he admits his mistake, and pledges to help Adam while firing Dr. Hendrickson for trying to smear Wayne. At the same time, the truck carrying Adam passes by high voltage lines, exposing him to more electrical waves and causing him to grow to 50 feet, escaping confinement. He mistakes Nick and Mandy for toys and puts them in his overalls pocket before heading for Las Vegas, pursued by his parents and the authorities. Wayne and Sterling figure out the cause of his growth and realize that exposure to Las Vegas' neon lights will make him grow bigger than ever. Dr. Hendrickson conspires with board director Terrence Wheeler to start a boardroom coup to take Sterling out of power. Dr. Hendrickson forcefully boards a military helicopter to attempt to tranquilize Adam.

Wayne is determined to use his shrink ray to shrink Adam back to normal but requires that Adam stand still for twelve seconds. Adam grows to 112 feet, wanders through Fremont Street, Las Vegas, causing mass panic. Dr. Hendrickson arrives by helicopter and starts shooting tranquilizer cartridges at Adam, but is stopped by Diane, deliberately made giant by Wayne's machine. She then comforts Adam and makes him stand still while Wayne powers the shrinking machine. The shrinking is successful, and both return to normal size. Dr. Hendrickson arrives to reluctantly congratulate Wayne but is knocked out with a punch by Diane.

Wayne and Diane then realize that Nick and Mandy were still in Adam's pocket and have been shrunk. Wayne quickly finds them, but decides to give them a few minutes of privacy before returning them to normal size as the two appear to have become romantically attached. The police officer asks the Szalinskis what what are they going to do with bunny who is still 112 feet tall, Adam decides for them all by playing with it.

Cast
 Rick Moranis as Wayne Szalinski, a wacky inventor.  
 Marcia Strassman as Diane Szalinski, Wayne's wife.
 Robert Oliveri as Nick Szalinski, Wayne and Diane's teenage son and middle child.
 Daniel & Joshua Shalikar as Adam Szalinski, Wayne and Diane's two-year-old son and youngest child. 
 Lloyd Bridges as Clifford Sterling, the president of Sterling Labs. 
 John Shea as Dr. Charles Hendrickson, Wayne's insolent coworker.
 Keri Russell as Mandy Park, Adam's babysitter and Nick's love interest.
 Ron Canada as U. S. Marshal Preston Brooks
 Amy O'Neill as Amy Szalinski, Wayne and Diane's daughter and oldest child.
 Michael Milhoan as Captain Ed Myerson, a military pilot who reluctantly pilots Dr. Hendrickson to confront Adam.
 Gregory Sierra as Terence Wheeler, a board member at Sterling Labs who is allied with Dr. Hendrickson.
 Leslie Neale as Constance Winters
 Linda Carlson as nosy neighbor
 Julia Sweeney as nosy neighbor

Production
The film was not originally written as a sequel to Honey, I Shrunk the Kids. Originally titled Big Baby, it was about a toddler who grew to giant size by a freak accident involving a growth ray and eventually terrorized Las Vegas in a non-violent, yet Godzillaesque way. Disney saw the possibilities of making this into a sequel to the first film and rewrote the script. The main characters from Big Baby became the Szalinski family, but there was no character in the original that Amy Szalinski could replace, so she leaves for college at the beginning of the film and is not seen again.

Prior to this, sequel development was offered to screenwriter and teacher David Trottier.

Casting
Rick Moranis, Marcia Strassman, Amy O'Neill, and Robert Oliveri all return as their respective characters: Wayne, Diane, Amy, and Nick Szalinski. Amy, now a young woman, leaves for her first year of college at the beginning of the film. Nick, while still considered "nerdy", has matured in his personality and takes more interest in girls and guitars.

Casting director Renee Rousselot searched over 1,000 small children for someone to portray Adam, the newest addition to the Szalinski clan. She searched for mostly three- to four-year-old boys because a younger child was thought to be problematic. She came across twins Daniel and Joshua Shalikar from New Jersey and immediately cast them in December 1990. One would act in the morning while the other was eating lunch or taking a nap. Baby consultant Elaine Hall Katz and director Randal Kleiser would plan the twins' scenes a week in advance. Tom Smith reported that, "On his own, Dan was almost too adventuresome to repeat one move, and Josh seemed very cautious. Put them together and they could do anything." However, the film did have difficulties in working with such small children, and one crew member later remarked it was "like playing hopscotch on hot coals".
At the time, the twins were scheduled to appear in two more Honey films. They did appear once, but were recast in Honey, We Shrunk Ourselves.

In the film, Nick has a crush on a girl named Mandy Park, played by Keri Russell in her first feature film. John Shea portrays Dr. Charles Hendrickson, who is scheming to get Wayne's control of the project, while Lloyd Bridges portrays Clifford Sterling, the owner of Sterling Labs.

Fred Rogers and Richard Simmons are also seen in videos in TV scenes in the film.

Production
Randal Kleiser, of Grease and White Fang fame, was chosen to direct the film, replacing Joe Johnston. He would return to film with the cast in the 3D show Honey, I Shrunk the Audience, which was presented at several Disney parks until 2010. Like the first film, and Grease, it had animated opening credits.

Production began on June 17, 1991. Filming took place in Simi Valley, California, for the parts involving the Szalinskis' house. Filming locations in Las Vegas included the Hard Rock Hotel and Casino, the Mirage hotel-casino, and Fremont Street. Scenes involving a water park, where Nick worked and where Mandy is first introduced, were filmed at Wet 'n Wild in Las Vegas.

While post-production special effects were used heavily throughout the film, some effects were practical (shot on-set). When Adam knocks down his bedroom door, production designer Leslie Dilley created a set with miniature furniture about four feet away from the camera, while the adult actors would be about fifteen feet away. Kleiser recalled, "Danny was generally better at improvising and fresh reactions. Josh was better at following directions, so we would alternate."

Lawsuit before release
Disney would later find itself the subject of a lawsuit as a result of the film. The suit was filed in 1991 by Mark Goodson Productions director Paul Alter, who claimed to have come up with the idea of an oversized toddler after babysitting his granddaughter and watching her topple over building blocks. He wrote a screenplay titled "Now, That's a Baby!", which had not been made into a film but had received some sort of treatment beforehand. Alter claimed there were several similarities between the film and his script, which consisted of the baby daughter of two scientists falling victim to a genetic experiment gone wrong instead of an enlarging ray. The case went to trial in 1993, with the jury finding in Alter's favor. Disney was forced to pay $300,000 in damages.

Release

Home media
The film was first released on VHS and LaserDisc on January 6, 1993. It was released on a bare-bones DVD in 2002. While the VHS release contained no bonus material besides a music video, the LaserDisc release contains the 1992 animated short film, Off His Rockers directed by Barry Cook, which accompanied the theatrical release. To date, Off His Rockers has only appeared on the Laserdisc release, making its availability rare, although the short can be viewed on YouTube.

The film was released on VHS in 1997, alongside its predecessor to coincide with the release of the third film in the series, Honey, We Shrunk Ourselves.

Reception

Box office
The film opened on July 17, 1992 in 2,492 theaters in the United States and Canada, almost twice as many as the first film. It opened at number one on opening weekend with $11 million and grossed $58.7 million in the United States and Canada. Internationally it grossed $37 million for a worldwide total of $96 million.

Critical response
On Rotten Tomatoes, the film has an approval rating of 40% based on reviews from 20 critics, with an average rating of 4.85/10. On Metacritic the film has a score of 50 based on reviews from 14 critics, indicating "mixed or average reviews". Audiences polled by CinemaScore gave the film an average grade of "B+" on an A+ to F scale.

Desson Howe of The Washington Post claimed that the film "feels narratively limited. It's a one-joke movie: Adam just gets bigger and bigger. All Moranis needs to do is get the shrinker from the last movie and turn it on Adam." Also from The Washington Post, Hal Hinson  agreed that it was "a one-joke film" while also adding the film "squanders most of the comic opportunities its premise offers. As one-joke movies go, it's fairly inoffensive but also never better than mildly diverting. Roger Ebert, reviewing for the Chicago Sun-Times, criticized the weak story writing that there "may be, for all I know, comic possibilities in a giant kid, but this movie doesn't find them." He further concluded that the "special effects, on the other hand, are terrific, as they were in the first movie. The filmmakers are able to combine the giant baby and the "real world" in shots that seem convincing, and the image of the toddler walking down Glitter Gulch is state-of-the-art. Too bad the movie relies on special effects to carry the show, and doesn't bring much else to the party."

Soundtrack

Intrada Records released the record in 1992, in time for the film's release. The score was composed and conducted by Bruce Broughton, who would return to provide the score for Honey, I Shrunk the Audience. "Stayin Alive" by the Bee Gees appears in it. So does "Loco-Motion" by Carole King, Gerry Goffin, and "Ours If We Want It" written by Tom Snow and Mark Mueller. The soundtrack album consists of just the score. In 2017, the label released an expanded edition included Broughton's score for Off His Rockers, the animated short that preceded the film in cinemas.

1992 album

2017 album

See also
 List of films set in Las Vegas

References

External links

 
 
 
 

1990s adventure films
1990s science fiction comedy films
1992 comedy films
1992 films
American children's comedy films
American science fiction comedy films
American sequel films
1990s English-language films
Films about size change
Films directed by Randal Kleiser
Films set in 1992
Films set in the Las Vegas Valley
Films set in Nevada
Films shot in the Las Vegas Valley
Films shot in Nevada
Honey, I Shrunk the Kids (franchise) mass media
Walt Disney Pictures films
Fictional portrayals of the Las Vegas Metropolitan Police Department
Films scored by Bruce Broughton
Films about giants
Films produced by Dawn Steel
Films produced by Edward S. Feldman
1990s American films